Tetyana Nylivna Yablonska (24 February 1917 – 17 June 2005) was a Ukrainian painter. Her early vital pictures were devoted to the work and life of Ukrainian people ("Bread", 1949). She moved to general images of nature, delivering a subtlety of plastic and color rhythms ("Anonymous heights", 1969; "Flax", 1977).

Yablonska was born in Smolensk, Russian Empire (modern-day Russia). She studied at the Kyiv State Institute of Art (1941), the studio of Fedir Krychevsky. She worked very productively until the very end of her life, reportedly painting her last pastel etude on the very day of her death.

She was elected as a Member of parliament of the Ukrainian Soviet Socialistic Republic (Ukrainian Verkhovna Rada, English Supreme Council) in 1951–58, became a member of the Ukrainian Artists' Union in 1944, a member of the board of the USSR Artists' Union in 1963, and a member of the Academy of Art of the USSR in 1975.

Yablonska was awarded the honorary title "Peoples' Artists of the USSR" in 1982, "Artist of Year" (UNESCO) in 1997, "Woman of Year" (International Biography Centre, Cambridge) in 2000. She was the winner of the USSR State Prize (Stalin prize: 1949, 1951 and State Prize: 1979), and winner of the Shevchenko state prize of Ukraine (1998).

She also received the Order of the Red Banner of Labour (1951), the Order of Friendship of Peoples (1977), order Award for merits (1997) and the highest state award of Ukraine – title Hero of Ukraine (2003).

She died in Kyiv on June 17, 2005.

Her students include Mikhail Turovsky.

References

External links 

Online Gallery of the later works by Yablonska 
Yablonska's site OpenUA.Net 
Tetyana Yablonska: About Herself, Zerkalo Nedeli, #24(552), June 25, 2005.  (in Ukrainian, in Russian)
Interview with her daughter Gayane Akopyan, Komsomolskaya Pravda 
Memoirs of Yablonska, Komsomolskaya Pravda 
L.Vladich.T.N.Yablonska. Kyiv, 1958
A set of postcards by Tetyana Yablonska

1917 births
2005 deaths
People from Smolensk
People from Smolensk Governorate
People's Artists of the USSR (visual arts)
Full Members of the USSR Academy of Arts
Soviet painters
Shevchenko State Art School alumni
Recipients of the title of People's Painter of Ukraine
Recipients of the Order of State
Recipients of the title of Hero of Ukraine
Recipients of the Shevchenko National Prize
Recipients of the Order of Merit (Ukraine), 2nd class
Third convocation members of the Verkhovna Rada of the Ukrainian Soviet Socialist Republic
Fourth convocation members of the Verkhovna Rada of the Ukrainian Soviet Socialist Republic
Soviet women in politics
20th-century Ukrainian women politicians
20th-century Ukrainian painters
21st-century Ukrainian painters
20th-century Ukrainian women artists
21st-century Ukrainian women artists
Women members of the Verkhovna Rada